is a Japanese manga written and illustrated by Shinri Fuwa. First serialized in Chara Selection, the manga was later adapted and released in North America by Digital Manga Publishing. The adaptation received mostly positive reception by reviewers.

Plot

Release
A Gentleman's Kiss was first published in the Japanese manga magazine Chara Selection from August 25, 2005 to April 25, 2006. The manga series was adapted into English, and released in North America by Digital Manga Publishing. Both volumes were released between August, and November 2008. In addition to the two volume series, a Drama CD was also released in April, 2006.

Reception
Danielle Van Gorder from Mania.com described the art as "interesting, bold and very assured", and felt that although the story had many cliches, it was "executed well enough" to make it feel fresh.  Van Gorder felt that in places, the characterisation was too subtle. Rachel Bentham, writing for Active Anime, enjoyed the art and story, saying that the "men are handsome, the romance dangerous". Katherine Farmar, writing for Comics Village, compared the premise to Romeo and Juliet, but appreciated that this was only the premise, and that the story became more complex with a love triangle with "uncertainty and ambiguity". Leroy Douresseaux of Comic Book Bin enjoyed the lack of a seme-uke dynamic, and enjoyed the stubborn strength of the characters.

References

External links
Official website at Chara (magazine)
A Gentleman's Kiss at Digital Manga Publishing

2005 manga
Drama anime and manga
Digital Manga Publishing titles
Tokuma Shoten manga
Yaoi anime and manga